That Girl from Paris is a 1936 American musical comedy film directed by Leigh Jason and starring Lily Pons, Jack Oakie, and Gene Raymond. The film made a profit of $101,000. John O. Aalberg was nominated for an Academy Award in the category Sound Recording.

Plot

Nikki Martin, a Parisian opera star, takes off in search of adventure and true-love leaving her arranged husband to be at the alter. While hitchhiking, Nikki meets handsome American musician, Windy McLean and his band, the McLean Wildcats. Windy immediately spites her, but Nikki falls in love with him and follows him to New York by stowing away on the ship his on. The steward finds her hiding in Windy and the Wilcats room. She is locked up by authorities and Windy and the band are fired. When the ship reaches New York, Nikki escapes off the ship and finds out the Wilcats apartment. They demand her to leave, fearing being implicated but she refuses. Clair, Windy girlfriend shows up with Hammacher, and offers the band a low paying job at a roadhouse in another city. Anxious to depart, they accept. Nikki becomes the bands singer. Clair becomes jealous and reports her to the authorities, causing the band to flee again.

Cast 
 Lily Pons as Nicole 'Nikki' Martin
 Jack Oakie as Whammo Lonsdale
 Gene Raymond as Windy McLean
 Herman Bing as 'Hammy' Hammacher
 Mischa Auer as Butch
 Lucille Ball as Claire 'Clair' Williams
 Frank Jenks as Laughing Boy Frank
 Alec Craig as Justice of the Peace

References

External links
 
 
 
 

1936 films
1936 musical comedy films
1930s romantic musical films
American black-and-white films
American romantic comedy films
American romantic musical films
Films directed by Leigh Jason
Films scored by Nathaniel Shilkret
RKO Pictures films
Films with screenplays by Jane Murfin
1930s English-language films
1930s American films